NA-57 Rawalpindi-VI is a constituency for the National Assembly of Pakistan.

Members of Parliament

1970–1977: NW-29 Rawalpindi-IV

1977–2002: NA-39 Rawalpindi-IV

2002–2018: NA-53 Rawalpindi-IV

2018-2023: NA-63 Rawalpindi-VII

Election 2002 

General elections were held on 10 Oct 2002. Ghulam Sarwar Khan an Independent candidate won by 66,900 votes.

Election 2008 

The result of general election 2008 in this constituency is given below.

Result 
Nisar Ali Khan succeeded in the election 2008 and became the member of National Assembly.

Election 2013

Result 
Ghulam Sarwar Khan of PTI succeeded in the election 2013 and became the member of National Assembly.

Election 2018 
General elections were held on 25 July 2018. Ghulam Sarwar Khan of Pakistan Tehreek-e-Insaf won the election but vacated this constituency in favor of NA-59 (Rawalpindi-III).

By-election 2018
By-elections were held in this constituency on 14 October 2018.

By-election 2023 
A by-election will be held on 16 March 2023 due to the resignation of Mansoor Hayat Khan, the previous MNA from this seat.

See also
NA-56 Rawalpindi-V
NA-58 Chakwal

References

External links 
Election result's official website
Delimitation 2018 official website Election Commission of Pakistan

63
63